Enter Life is an 8-minute animated film from 1982 about the earliest origin of life, or abiogensis on earth. Directed by Faith Hubley of Hubley Studios, the film traces a possible course of development, according to contemporary theory, of organic compounds, amino acids and early cellular organisms.

Featuring anthropomorphic amino acids and cells and a light-hearted touch, with music by Elizabeth Swados, the film has shown considerable durability, still being shown on continuous loop at the National Museum of Natural History of the Smithsonian Institution, which sponsored the original production.

External links

1982 films
1982 animated films
1980s American animated films
1980s animated short films
American animated documentary films
American animated short films
1980s English-language films